Capre DiEnd is Swedish power metal band Steel Attack's sixth studio album. Three new members (Simon Johansson, Johan Löfgren, and Peter Morén) joined with this album. A video was shot for the song "Angels" with director Owe Lingvall from Nocturnal Rites.

Track listing

Album line-up 
Ronny Hemlin - Vocals
John Allan - Guitar
Simon Johansson - Guitar
Johan Löfgren - Bass
Peter Morén - Drums

Sources
 Steel Attack page

2008 albums
Steel Attack albums
Massacre Records albums